Eulophiinae is an orchid subtribe in the tribe Cymbidieae. It comprises 270 species divided into nine genera, with the genus Eulophia comprising 60% of these species.

See also 
 Taxonomy of the Orchidaceae

References

External links 
Phylogenetics of Eulophiinae (Orchidaceae: Epidendroideae): evolutionary patterns and implications for generic delimitation retrieved December 20 2018

 
Orchid subtribes